Lancelot John Fish  (1861 - 1924) was Archdeacon of Bath from 1909 until his death on  29 September 1924.

Lancelot was educated at Harrow and Trinity College, Cambridge. He was Chaplain at Christ Church, Cannes from 1900 to 1903;  Vicar of Bathampton until 1907; He was Chaplain at St Andrew, Biarritz from 1907 to 1909; and then Vicar of St Stephen Lansdown, Bath until 1923. from 1902 to 1938.

Notes

1861 births
Alumni of Trinity College, Cambridge
People educated at Harrow School
Archdeacons of Bath
1924 deaths